Artur Rozmus (born November 1, 1977) is a Polish striker who has been playing for Polonia Bytom since 2005.

External links 
 Artur Rozmus profile - 90minut.pl

1977 births
Living people
Polish footballers
Siarka Tarnobrzeg players
Odra Wodzisław Śląski players
Polonia Bytom players
Association football forwards
Place of birth missing (living people)